Joyce Weston (born October 7, 1949) is an American politician, who was elected to the New Hampshire House of Representatives in the 2018 elections. She will represent the Grafton 8th District (Plymouth, Hebron, Holderness) as a member of the Democratic Party.

References

Living people
Democratic Party members of the New Hampshire House of Representatives
LGBT state legislators in New Hampshire
Women state legislators in New Hampshire
Lesbian politicians
21st-century American politicians
People from Plymouth, New Hampshire
21st-century American women politicians
1949 births